The Battle of Kotesashi refers to two separate battles in 14th century Japan.

 Battle of Kotesashi (1333)
 Battle of Kotesashi (1352)